Minden Cathedral, dedicated to Saints Gorgonius and Peter, is a Roman Catholic church in the city of Minden, North Rhine-Westphalia, Germany.  From the year 803 AD, when the area was conquered by Charlemagne, it was the center of a diocese and subsequently became the center of a small sovereign state, a prince-bishopric (Hochstift) of Minden, until the time of the Peace of Westphalia (1648), when Minden was secularized as the Principality of Minden (which lasted until 1806).  Today the church belongs to the diocese of Paderborn.

History 

Over the course of many centuries, the cathedral grew from a simple Carolingian church to a monumental basilica.  The High Gothic nave and its large tracery windows inspired a number of other buildings.  During World War II, the church was almost completely destroyed by an aerial bombing conducted by US Army Air Force B17s on 28 March 1945. This almost completely destroyed the town center including the town hall and cathedral and resulted in the death of over 180 people. 

The church was rebuilt in the 1950s by architect Werner March.  The church contains a number of valuable art treasures.

Patronage 
From Rome in the 8th century the remains of St. Gorgonius were translated by Saint Chrodegang, Bishop of Metz to the monastery of Gorze in Lorraine. Some of the relics were later translated to Minden Cathedral.

References

Former cathedrals in Germany
Roman Catholic cathedrals in North Rhine-Westphalia
Cathedral
Gothic hall churches in Germany
Buildings and structures in Minden (city)